This is a list of people who served as Lord Lieutenant of County Donegal.

There were lieutenants of counties in Ireland until the reign of James II, when they were renamed governors. The office of Lord Lieutenant was recreated on 23 August 1831. The office is pronounced as 'Lord Lef-tenant'.

Lieutenant
 Rory O'Donnell, 1st Earl of Tyrconnell: 28 March 1605–

Governors
 
 Henry Conyngham, 1st Earl Conyngham: 1746–1781
 Ralph Gore, 1st Earl of Ross: 1781–
 William Conyngham: 1781–1796 
 Robert Clements, 1st Earl of Leitrim: 1781–1804 
 Sir Samuel Hayes, 1st Baronet: 1781–1807 
 John Hamilton, 1st Marquess of Abercorn (died 1818)
 Nathaniel Clements, 2nd Earl of Leitrim: –1831
 Henry Conyngham, 1st Marquess Conyngham: 1803–1831
 Sir Samuel Hayes, 3rd Baronet: –1831

Lord Lieutenants
The 2nd Marquess of Donegall: 17 October 1831 – 5 October 1844
The 1st Duke of Abercorn: 13 November 1844 – 31 October 1885
The 2nd Duke of Abercorn: 1885 – 3 January 1913
Sir John Olphert: 9 August 1913 – 11 March 1917
The 6th Earl of Arran: 25 August 1917 – 1920
Sir Emerson Crawford Herdman: 17 December 1920 – 1922

References

Donegal
Politics of County Donegal
History of County Donegal